Archibald N. Randall (August 22, 1830 – July 16, 1916) was an American lawyer and politician.

Born in Sardinia, Erie County, New York, Randall attended Brockport Collegiate Institute. In 1847, Randall moved to the town of Avon, Wisconsin Territory. He served in the 13th Wisconsin Infantry Regiment during the American Civil War and was commissioned a captain. In 1869, he moved to Brodhead, Wisconsin. In 1873, Randall was admitted to the Wisconsin bar. Randall served on the Board of Supervisors in Rock and Green Counties. In 1882 and 1883, Randall served in the Wisconsin State Senate and was a Republican. Randall died at his home in Brodhead, Wisconsin due to injuries from tripping over a croquet arch.

Notes

1830 births
1916 deaths
People from Brodhead, Wisconsin
People from Erie County, New York
People of Wisconsin in the American Civil War
State University of New York at Brockport alumni
Wisconsin lawyers
County supervisors in Wisconsin
Republican Party Wisconsin state senators
People from Avon, Wisconsin
19th-century American lawyers